Starkoč is a municipality and village in Kutná Hora District in the Central Bohemian Region of the Czech Republic. It has about 100 inhabitants.

History
The first written mention of Starkoč is from 1355.

References

Villages in Kutná Hora District